















Lists of country codes